That Day We Sang is a British musical written and composed by Victoria Wood. It is based on a true story of the reunion of a famous recording of Nymphs and Shepherds in 1929 by The Manchester Children's Choir.

2011 Manchester International Festival
The play was commissioned for the Manchester International Festival, and was first performed at the Manchester Opera House in July 2011, under the direction of Victoria Wood, for just ten performances. The cast was accompanied by a choir and the Hallé Youth Orchestra.
 Vincent Franklin as Tubby
 Jenna Russell as Enid
 Lorraine Bruce as Dorothy/Pauline
 Raif Clarke as Young Jimmy
 Alison Pargeter as Gertrude Riall

2013 Manchester Royal Exchange Cast
A rewritten production opened at the Royal Exchange Theatre for Christmas 2013, directed by Sarah Frankcom.

 Dean Andrews as Tubby
 Anna Francolini as Enid
 Kelly Price as Gertrude Riall

2014 television film

Provisionally entitled Tubby and Enid, filming of a television adaption began on 6 January 2014 using locations in Liverpool, Manchester and Huddersfield Town Hall. It was produced by Paul Frift with executive producers Hilary Bevan Jones and Matthew Read and eventually broadcast under the original name on 26 December 2014. Seen by 2.57 million viewers, it was the 8th most watched programme on BBC2 that week. It was Wood's last major work before her death in April 2016.

 Imelda Staunton as Enid
 Michael Ball as Tubby (Jimmy)
 Sophie Thompson as Dorothy
 Conleth Hill as Frank
Harvey Chaisty as Young Jimmy (Tubby)
 Dorothy Atkinson as Gertrude Riall
 Daniel Rigby as Mr. Kirkby
 Jessica Gunning as Pauline
 Lyndsey Marshal as Sal
 Charles De'Ath as Lionel
 Malcolm Sinclair as Sir Hamilton Harty
 Ian Lavender as Commissionaire/Older Mr. Kirkby

An hour-long documentary That Musical We Made, about the making of the telefilm, was broadcast the following day and featured archive clips from the original reunion documentary about the real-life choristers which Wood first viewed in her twenties.

Michael Ball played Nymphs and Shepherds composer Henry Purcell in the 1995 film England, My England.

References

External links
 

2014 in British television
2014 television specials
2010s English-language films
Films shot in England
Musical television specials
BBC television musicals
2014 television films
2011 musicals
Musicals inspired by real-life events
British musicals
Films shot in Greater Manchester